Minnie Soo Wai Yam  (born 13 April 1998) is a Hong Kong table tennis player. In 2018, she won bronze in the women’s team event at the World Championship and the Asian Games. Later at the 2020 Summer Olympics, she also won a bronze medal in the women’s team event with Doo Hoi Kem and Lee Ho Ching.

Early years and education
Soo is the daughter of former Hong Kong table tennis player Soo Chun-wah. She was exposed to the sport at age 3½ and began receiving formal training at 5 years old. At 10 years old, she joined Hong Kong's youth table tennis team. She was a student of Diocesan Girls' School but dropped out in secondary three to become a full-time athlete.

In September 2022, she started studying at the Hong Kong University of Science and Technology, majoring physics.

Career

2021 
At the 2020 Summer Olympics, Soo, as well as her teammates Doo Hoi Kem and Lee Ho Ching, qualified for the women’s team event. They won bronze after defeating the German team with 3-1, earning Hong Kong’s first medal in the Olympics team event and second medal in table tennis.

See also 

 Hong Kong at the 2020 Summer Olympics

References

External links 

 Minnie Soo at Olympedia

Hong Kong female table tennis players
Living people
1998 births
Table tennis players at the 2018 Asian Games
Table tennis players at the 2020 Summer Olympics
Asian Games medalists in table tennis
Asian Games bronze medalists for Hong Kong
Medalists at the 2018 Asian Games
Olympic medalists in table tennis
Medalists at the 2020 Summer Olympics
Olympic bronze medalists for Hong Kong
World Table Tennis Championships medalists
Hong Kong expatriate sportspeople in Japan
Expatriate table tennis people in Japan
Olympic table tennis players of Hong Kong